Jean-Louis Bouquet (1900–1978) was a French screenwriter. He also edited and directed some films.

Selected filmography
 The City Destroyed (1924)
 Mandrin (1924)
 Temptation (1929)
 The Drunkard (1937)
 Golden Venus (1938)
 The Five Cents of Lavarede (1939)
 Fantômas (1946)

References

Bibliography
 Lee Grieveson & Peter Kramer. The Silent Cinema Reader. Psychology Press, 2004.

External links

1900 births
1978 deaths
20th-century French screenwriters
Film directors from Paris
French film editors